Bhagavath Singh is a 1998 Indian Tamil-language action drama film, written and directed by Chandrakumar. The film stars Napoleon and Sanghavi, while Goundamani and Senthil appear in supporting roles. Music for the film was composed by Deva and the film was released on 12 March 1998.

Cast
 Napoleon as Bhagavath Singh 
 Sanghavi as Sarojini
 Sangeetha
 Goundamani
 Senthil
 Vinu Chakravarthy
 Ajay Rathnam
 Nizhalgal Ravi
 Visu
Thalaivasal Vijay
Alex
Mahendran
Ra. Sankaran

Production
The film marked the second venture of film maker Chandra Kumar, with Napoléon, Sanghavi and Sangeetha brought in to play the lead roles. The film marked Sangeetha's debut, after her first project, Poonjolai was shelved.

Soundtrack
The film's soundtrack was composed by Deva and lyrics written by Kalidasan.

Release
The film was ready for release by November 1997, but was delayed as a result of overcrowding at the box office. The film opened in December 1998 to negative reviews with a critic from Indolink.com stating that the film spoils the freedom fighter Bhagat Singh's name, while noting that the lead actor "has the physique for a police officer but he is often let down by his voice modulation".

References

1998 films
1990s Tamil-language films
1990s action drama films
1990s masala films
Films scored by Deva (composer)
Indian action drama films
1998 drama films